Wintergatan ("the Milky Way") is a Swedish folktronica band from Gothenburg. Martin Molin and Marcus Sjöberg were previously part of the former band Detektivbyrån. 

The band released their first track in late 2012, titled Sommarfågel, and released their debut album Wintergatan in 2013. The band toured with the album around Sweden in 2014 and 2016; Julia Jonas substituted for Evelina Hägglund during some 2014 performances.

Members 
Wintergatan is made up of four musicians, Martin Molin, Evelina Hägglund, David Zandén and Marcus Sjöberg.

The band's members all play various instruments, but have primary specializations. Martin Molin specializes in the vibraphone as well as the electronic instruments that define Wintergatan's sound, Evelina Hägglund specializes in keyboard instruments, David Zandén specializes in bass, and Marcus Sjöberg specializes in drums.

Instruments 
The band uses a variety of unconventional instruments including the Modulin, a ribbon controlled synthesizer built from Doepfer eurorack modules in the likeness of a violin, the Moog Theremini digital theremin, an electric autoharp, a hammered dulcimer,
a self-built punch-card music box, a slide projector, a musical saw, and a typewriter for use as percussion.

Marble Machine
Between December 2014 and March 2016, the band uploaded several YouTube videos featuring Martin Molin documenting the construction of a music box that uses marbles to play instruments. The machine is powered by a hand-crank, and works by raising steel marbles through the machine into multiple feeder tubes, where they are then released from height via programmable release gates, falling and striking a musical instrument below. Instruments played by marbles striking them include a vibraphone, bass guitar, cymbal, and emulated kick drum, high hat and snare drum sounds using contact microphones. The music score is stored on two programmable wheels that utilize Lego Technic beams and stud connectors to trigger armatures to release the marbles. A final music video showing the machine in use was released in 2016, and has been viewed over 200 million times.

Ten months after the debut of the original Marble Machine, the band announced their plans to make a new marble machine for the purpose of touring. The new machine, to be called "Marble Machine X", would solve a multitude of mechanical functionality problems with the original Marble Machine. Martin Molin, the builder of the original Marble Machine, was collaborating with a team of engineers and designers as well as fans for the design and build of the Marble Machine X. The original Marble Machine came back in his possession after being exhibited in Museum Speelklok in Utrecht, the Netherlands. Martin Molin stopped building the MMX at the end of 2021 after realizing the design would not be robust or reliable enough to go on tour with. The first two machines have been donated to a museum for mechanical music machines in Germany called "Siegfried's Mechanical Music Cabinet" and in March 2022 he started to design a third version, with the series name being called Martin vs the Machine.

Discography

Albums 
 Wintergatan (2013) (with the singles "Sommarfågel" and "Starmachine2000")

Singles
 Emerson (2011)
 Sommarfågel (2013)
 Starmachine2000 (2013)
 Tornado (2013)
 Biking Is Better (2013)
 All Was Well (2013)
 Visa från Utanmyra (2014)
 Marble Machine (2016)
 Music Machine Mondays Theme Song (2017)
 Music Box, Harp & Hammered Dulcimer (2018)
 Moon And Star (2018)
 Sandviken Stradivarius (2018)
 Local Cluster (2018)
 Olivier (2018)
 Proof of Concept (2019)

References

External links
 
 

Folktronica musicians
Swedish electronic music groups
Inventors of musical instruments
Musical groups from Gothenburg
Musical groups established in 2012
2012 establishments in Sweden